The fifth edition of the Johan Cruyff Shield was held on 13 August 2000 between 1999–2000 Eredivisie champions PSV Eindhoven and 1999–2000 KNVB Cup winners Roda JC. PSV won the match 2–0.

Match

Details

References 

2000
Johan Cruijff-schaal
J
J
Johan Cruyff Shield